The white-tailed nuthatch (Sitta himalayensis) is a species of bird in the family Sittidae. It ranges across the northern and northeastern parts of the Indian Subcontinent, existing mainly in the low-to-middle Himalayas, as well as associated mountain ranges. It is found in Bhutan, India, Laos, Myanmar, Nepal, Tibet and Thailand.

Description and ecology

It may be identified by the buff underside, smaller beak than in the Kashmir nuthatch (S. cashmirensis). The white on the upper tail coverts is difficult to see in the field. It has a small bill and rufous-orange underparts with unmarked bright rufous undertail-coverts.

Resident in the sub-Himalayan range from Himachal Pradesh to Arunachal Pradesh and into the South Assam Hills (Lushai Hills). It breeds from March to May in broad-leaved and mixed forest.

Habitat 
Its natural habitats are subtropical or tropical moist lowland forests and subtropical or tropical moist montane forests.

References

External links

 
 
 
 
 
 

white-tailed nuthatch
Birds of North India
Birds of Nepal
Birds of Eastern Himalaya
Birds of Myanmar
white-tailed nuthatch
Taxonomy articles created by Polbot